Colegiales are persons affiliated with University of Puerto Rico at Mayagüez, commonly including alumni, current and former faculty members, students, and others. Here follows a list of notable Colegiales.

Alumni proudly declare themselves "colegiales" even after graduating from the institution. Being a "colegial" becomes part of an individual's identity.

Notable alumni of University of Puerto Rico at Mayagüez

Notable faculty of University of Puerto Rico at Mayagüez

Deans, vice chancellor and chancellors

See also

List of notable Puerto Ricans
List of University of Puerto Rico people

References

Puerto Rico At Mayaguez
University of Puerto Rico at Mayagüez